Bonzo Goes to College is a 1952 American comedy film directed by Frederick De Cordova and starring Maureen O'Sullivan, Edmund Gwenn, Charles Drake, Gigi Perreau, Gene Lockhart, and Bonzo.

Plot

Former lab chimpanzee Bonzo, suddenly literate, runs away from a carnival sideshow. He lands in the college town of Pawlton, where young Betsy mistakenly believes the chimp is a gift from her grandfather, Pop Drew, the football coach at Pawlton.

Betsy wants to formally adopt Bonzo, something her parents, Marion and Malcolm Drew, aren't too sure about. A judge goes along with the idea, pretending to officially approve an adoption, just to humor the girl. Betsy then writes her other grandfather, millionaire Clarence Gateson, to inform him she now has a baby brother. Gateson is thrilled until he arrives in Pawlton and finds the truth.

Gateson warms up to Bonzo and even takes him golfing. Discovering what a natural athlete the chimpanzee is, an idea is hatched that Bonzo could play quarterback for the college, where Pop is desperate for good players. A couple of con men, Edwards and Wilbur Crane, kidnap the chimpanzee just before the big game and replace Bonzo with one that can't play ball. Before they can collect their bets, the real Bonzo turns up and wins the game.

Cast
 Maureen O'Sullivan as Marion Gateson Drew
 Edmund Gwenn as Ten 'Pop' Drew
 Charles Drake as Malcolm Drew
 Gigi Perreau as Betsy Drew
 Gene Lockhart as Clarence B. Gateson 
 Bonzo as Bonzo
 Irene Ryan as Nancy 
 John Miljan as Wilbur Crane 
 Frank Nelson as Dick 
 Jerry Paris as Edwards
 Guy Williams as Ronald Calkins
 Richard Garrick as Judge George Simpkins
 Tom Harmon as Tom Harmon

References

External links

1952 films
1950s sports comedy films
American black-and-white films
American sports comedy films
American football films
American sequel films
Films about apes
Films about animals playing sports
Films directed by Frederick de Cordova
Films set in universities and colleges
Universal Pictures films
Films scored by Frank Skinner
1952 comedy films
1950s English-language films
1950s American films